The 1874 Waitemata by-elections were two by-elections held on 28 July and 8 September 1874 in the  electorate during the 5th New Zealand Parliament.

The first (28 July) by-election was caused by the resignation of the incumbent MP Thomas Henderson on 24 April 1874.

The first by-election was won by Gustav von der Heyde. William Lee Rees had been nominated but subsequently decided not to stand. This by-election was challenged by petition, as von der Heyde had not yet been naturalised.

However the second (8 September) by-election confirmed von der Heyde as the MP.

In both by-elections he was challenged by John Sangster Macfarlane, who subsequently won the seat in the 1876 general election. Macfarlane favoured abolition of the provinces, and said that the Provincial government was against him.

Results
The following tables gives the election results:

The poll totals for 8 September exclude 18 double votes for von der Heyde, 20 double votes for Macfarlane and 6 informal votes.

References

Waitemata 1874
1874 elections in New Zealand
Politics of the Auckland Region